Aleksa Jovanović may refer to:
Aleksa Jovanović (footballer) (born 1999), Serbian association football midfielder
Aleksa Jovanović (politician) (1846–1920), Prime Minister of Serbia, 1900–1901

See also
 Aleksandar Jovanović (disambiguation)